This article lists the complete results of the knockout stage of the 2008 Thomas Cup in Jakarta, Indonesia. All times are West Indonesia Time (UTC+07:00).

Bracket

Play-offs

New Zealand vs. Thailand

Japan vs. Germany

Canada vs. Korea

England vs. Nigeria

Quarter finals

China vs. Thailand

Malaysia vs. Japan

Denmark vs. Korea

Indonesia vs. England

Semi finals

China vs. Malaysia

Korea vs. Indonesia

Final

China vs. Korea

Thomas Cup Knockout Stage, 2008